Luke Bambridge and Jonny O'Mara were the defending champions but they lost in the first round to Dan Evans and Lloyd Glasspool.

Juan Sebastián Cabal and Robert Farah won the title, defeating Máximo González and Horacio Zeballos in the final, 3–6, 7–6(7–4), [10–6].

Seeds

Draw

Draw

References
 Main draw

Eastbourne International - Doubles
2019 Men's Doubles